The Military ranks of the Weimar Republic were the military ranks used by the Reichswehr.

Military ranks of the Peacetime Army (1919)

Commissioned officers

Enlisted personnel

Military ranks of the Provisional Reichswehr (1919–1920)

Commissioned officers

Enlisted personnel

Military ranks of the Reichswehr (1920–1935)

Commissioned officers

Enlisted personnel

Waffenfarben

Notes

References

Citations

Bibliography

Further reading
 
 

Weimar Republic
 
Military of the Weimar Republic